The following highways are numbered 65:

International
 Asian Highway 65
 European route E65

Canada
  Highway 65 (Ontario)

China 
  G65 Expressway

France
 Autoroute A65

Germany
  Bundesautobahn 65
 Bundesstraße 65

India
 
 Bihar State Highway 65
 Gujarat State Highway 65
 Kerala State Highway 65
 Maharashtra State Highway 65
 Rajasthan State Highway 65
 Tamil Nadu State Highway 65
 Uttar Pradesh State Highway 65

Iran
  Road 65 (Iran)

Israel
  Highway 65 (Israel)

Japan
 Shin-Kūkō Expressway

Jordan

Korea, South 
  Donghae Expressway
 National Route 65

Netherlands
 A65 motorway (Netherlands)

New Zealand
 New Zealand State Highway 65

Pakistan
 N-65 National Highway

Philippines 
 N65 highway (Philippines)

Saudi Arabia
  Highway 65 (Saudi Arabia)

Spain
 Autovía A-65
 C-65  Autovia C-65

Taiwan
 Provincial Highway 65 (Taiwan)

United Kingdom
  British A65
  British M65

United States
  Interstate 65
  U.S. Route 65
  Alabama State Route 65
  Arizona State Route 65 (former)
  California State Route 65
  Colorado State Highway 65
  Florida State Road 65
  County Road 65 (Franklin County, Florida)
  County Road 65 (Gadsden County, Florida)
  County Road 65A (Gadsden County, Florida)
  County Road 65B (Gadsden County, Florida)
  County Road 65C (Gadsden County, Florida)
  County Road 65D (Gadsden County, Florida)
  County Road 65 (Holmes County, Florida)
  Georgia State Route 65
  Georgia State Route 65 (1921–1926) (former)
  Hawaii Route 65
  Illinois Route 65
  Indiana State Road 65 (former)
  K-65 (Kansas highway)
  Maryland Route 65
 Maryland Route 65A
  M-65 (Michigan highway)
  Minnesota State Highway 65
  County Road 65 (Ramsey County, Minnesota)
 Missouri Route 65 (1922) (former)
  Nebraska Highway 65
  Nebraska Spur 65A
  Nevada State Route 65 (former)
  New Jersey Route 65 (former)
  County Route 65 (Bergen County, New Jersey)
  New Mexico State Road 65
  New York State Route 65
  County Route 65 (Cattaraugus County, New York)
  County Route 65 (Chautauqua County, New York)
  County Route 65 (Dutchess County, New York)
  County Route 65 (Erie County, New York)
  County Route 65 (Greene County, New York)
  County Route 65 (Herkimer County, New York)
  County Route 65 (Jefferson County, New York)
  County Route 65 (Livingston County, New York)
  County Route 65 (Oneida County, New York)
  County Route 65 (Orange County, New York)
  County Route 65 (Putnam County, New York)
  County Route 65 (Rensselaer County, New York)
  County Route 65 (Rockland County, New York)
  County Route 65 (Saratoga County, New York)
  County Route 65 (Schoharie County, New York)
  County Route 65 (Suffolk County, New York)
  County Route 65 (Sullivan County, New York)
  County Route 65 (Ulster County, New York)
  North Carolina Highway 65
  North Dakota Highway 65
  Ohio State Route 65
  Oklahoma State Highway 65
  Pennsylvania Route 65
  South Carolina Highway 65
  South Dakota Highway 65
  Tennessee State Route 65
  Texas State Highway 65
  Texas State Highway Spur 65
  Farm to Market Road 65
  Texas Park Road 65
  Utah State Route 65
  Vermont Route 65
  Virginia State Route 65
  West Virginia Route 65
  Wisconsin Highway 65
  Wyoming Highway 65 (former)

 Territories
  Puerto Rico Highway 65
  U.S. Virgin Islands Highway 65

See also
 A65 (disambiguation)